Following is a list of Ashkenazi Jewish restaurants:

 Attman's Delicatessen
 Brent's Deli
 Canter's
 Caplansky's Delicatessen
 D.Z. Akin's
 Henry S. Levy and Sons
 Katz's Deli, Houston
 Katz's Delicatessen, New York City
 Kenny & Zuke's Delicatessen
 Langer's Deli
 Loeb's NY Deli
 Russ & Daughters
 Yonah Schimmel's Knish Bakery

Defunct restaurants
 Wolfie Cohen's Rascal House

External links
Beyond Bubbe's Kitchen: The Best Spots for Traditional Jewish Food, Condé Nast Traveler
The top five Ashkenazi food joints in Jerusalem, GoJerusalem.com

 
Ashkenazi Jewish